Rōkyoku (also called naniwa-bushi) is a genre of traditional Japanese narrative singing. Generally accompanied by a shamisen, rōkyoku became very popular in Japan during the first half of the 20th century.

In modern Japanese slang, "naniwabushi" is sometimes used to mean "a sob story", since the songs were often about sad subjects.

Notable performers

Takeharu Kunimoto
Kumoemon Tochuken
Yoshida Naramaru
Haruo Minami
Hideo Murata
Ichirō Satsuki

Storytelling
Japanese styles of music
Japanese traditional music